Birthi Haveli is a village and Gram panchayat in Bilhaur Tehsil, Kanpur Nagar district, Uttar Pradesh, India. It is located 80 km away from Kanpur City. Village Code is 149920.

References

Villages in Kanpur Nagar district